Moïssala is the capital of Barh Sara, one of the departments of the Mandoul Region in southern Chad.

Mandoul Region
Populated places in Chad